This is a list of islands of Lebanon, from north to south:
Rabbit island 
Palm Islands
Palm 
Ramkine 
Sanani 
Other small islands, it is located 2 km from Sanani Island to the southeast:
Bellane Island (El Billan): 1,9 ha.
Romayleh (El Rmayleh)
El Ashak
El Tenieh
El Telteh
El Rabha (El Maatih)
Baqar
...and many small rock.
Zireh         Rabbit island

Notes

References

External links
Lebanon's Palm Island could hold key to solving rubbish crisis 20/12/2018.
The Rabbit Island , North Lebanon جزيرة الارانب ، شمال لبنان (Palm Island) 20/12/2018.
Lebanon islands map

Lebanon, List of islands of
 Islands of Lebanon
Islands